Leonardo Gomes may refer to:

 Léo Gomes (footballer, born 1996), Brazilian football right-back
 Léo Gomes (footballer, born 1997), Brazilian football midfielder